Faris al-Din Aktay al-Jamdar (d. 1254, Cairo) was a Turkic-Kipchak Emir (prince) and the leader of the Mamluks of the Bahri dynasty.

Biography
When the Ayyobid Sultan as-Salih Ayyub died Aktay was sent to Hasankeyf to recall Turanshah, the son and heir of the dead sultan, to Egypt. During the Battle of al-Mansurah he was one of the Mamluk commanders who defeated the Frankish forces led by the French king Louis IX.

Aktay was one of the Mamluks who collaborated in the murdering of Turanshah after the battle of al-Mansurah.
 

In 1251 he conquered parts of Syria and in 1252 the port city of Alexandria in northern Egypt became his own domain. He was known for his devotion to Islam and harsh treatment towards the Copts, the Christian minority.

In 1252, together with Faris al-Din Aktay al-Musta'rib, he suppressed a major rebellion led by al-Sharif Hisn al-Din Tha'lab in Middle and Upper Egypt.

Feeling that Aktay and his Mamluks were defying his authority and almost installed a state within his state, Aybak decided to kill him. In a conspiracy involving Aybak, Qutuz and some other Mamluks, Aktay was murdered in the sultan's fort and his Mamluks, including his friend Baybars al-Bunduqdari, fled to Syria and al-Karak.

1254 deaths
Bahri dynasty
Egyptian nobility
Mamluk emirs
Muslims of the Seventh Crusade
13th-century Kipchacks
Turkic rulers
Year of birth unknown